Cezary Baca (born 25 April 1969) is a Polish former footballer who played as a striker.

Career

Baca started his career with Polish sixth tier side . In 1991, Baca signed for Polish second tier club Stomil Olsztyn, where he made over 33 league appearances and scored 8 goals, helping them earn promotion to the Polish top flight.

Before the 1996 season, he signed for VPS in Finland. In 1997, Baca signed for Polish second tier team . In 2010, he signed for GLKS Jonkowo in the Polish  seventh tier, helping them earn promotion to the Polish sixth tier.

References

External links
 

1969 births
Association football forwards
Ekstraklasa players
Expatriate footballers in Finland
Expatriate footballers in Germany
I liga players
II liga players
Jeziorak Iława players
Living people
Polish expatriate footballers
Polish expatriate sportspeople in Finland
Polish expatriate sportspeople in Germany
Polish footballers
Sportspeople from Olsztyn
OKS Stomil Olsztyn players
Vaasan Palloseura players
Veikkausliiga players